Dirk Bach (23 April 1961 – 1 October 2012) was a German actor, comedian and television presenter, best known as the co-host of Ich bin ein Star – Holt mich hier raus!, the German version of I'm a Celebrity... Get Me Out of Here!.

Career 
Bach was born in Cologne. After school, he worked in theatres in Amsterdam, Brussels, London, New York, Utrecht, and Vienna. In 1992, Bach was a member of the theatre group in Cologne at the Schauspielhaus and appeared on the German television channel RTL on the Dirk Bach Show. He performed in Lukas (1996–2001) on the German TV channel ZDF, for which he received the Telestar award (1996), the German Comedy Award (1999), and the Goldene Kamera (2001).

In 2002, Bach starred in Der kleine Mönch on ZDF. He worked in Sesamstraße, the German version of Sesame Street, as the character Pepe. He often performed with Hella von Sinnen on different television productions. From 2004 on, Bach and Sonja Zietlow presented the German edition of the show I'm a Celebrity, Get Me Out of Here!. In 2005, he played the character Urmel in Urmel aus dem Eis (Impy's Island). Since 2006, Bach has hosted the German game show Frei Schnauze on RTL. In 2010, Bach appeared as Pastor Hinze on the soap opera Verbotene Liebe, in which he performed the first church wedding between two men ever dramatized on German television with characters Oliver Sabel and Christian Mann.

Other work 
Bach was an LGBT activist and member of the LSVD organisation (Lesbian and Gay Federation in Germany). He was part of the campaign to bring the 2010 Gay Games to Cologne. He also helped Amnesty International and the organization PETA.

Personal life and death 
Bach lived together with his partner Thomas in Cologne.

Bach died on 1 October 2012 in Berlin at the age of 51 from presumed heart failure.

Television 

 1983: 
 1984: Im Himmel ist die Hölle los / Hullygully in Käseburg
 1986: Kir Royal (TV series)
 1988: Krieg der Töne (TV experimental film)
 1989: Year of the Turtle
 1993: 
 1994: Die Weltings vom Hauptbahnhof – Scheidung auf Kölsch (TV series)
 1994: Drei zum Verlieben (TV series)
 1995: 
 1995: Marys verrücktes Krankenhaus (TV series)
 1996: Lukas (TV series)
 1997: Rendezvous des Todes (TV)
 1998: 
 1998: Varell & Decker (TV series)
 1999: Zum Sterben schön (TV)
 2001: Das Rätsel des blutroten Rubins (TV)
 2001: Der Mann, den sie nicht lieben durfte (TV)
 2002: Der kleine Mönch (TV series)
 2003: Karlchens Parade
 2003: Crazy Race 2 – Warum die Mauer wirklich fiel (TV)
 2003: 
 2005: Popp Dich schlank! (TV)
 2005: Urmel aus dem Eis (TV)
 2006:  (TV)
 2006: Crazy Race 3 – Sie knacken jedes Schloss (TV)
 2007: Die ProSieben Märchenstunde – Des Kaisers neue Kleider
 2009: Einfach Bach
 2010: Teufel Gott und Kaiser – Nibelungenfestspiele Worms

References

External links 

1961 births
2012 deaths
Actors from Cologne
German male comedians
German male film actors
German game show hosts
German male stage actors
German male television actors
German male voice actors
German television personalities
German gay actors
Gay comedians
German LGBT comedians
German LGBT broadcasters
German LGBT rights activists
20th-century German LGBT people
21st-century German LGBT people
20th-century German male actors
21st-century German male actors
RTL Group people